Benedicto Antonio Angeli (February 10, 1939 - June 3, 2021), known as Antoninho, was a former Brazilian football manager.

Managerial statistics

Honours
Fiorentina
Coppa Italia:  1960-61
UEFA Cup Winners' Cup: 1960-61

References

External links

1939 births
2021 deaths
Footballers from São Paulo (state)
Brazilian footballers
Brazilian football managers
Serie A players
J1 League managers
Campeonato Brasileiro Série A players
Sociedade Esportiva Palmeiras players
Botafogo Futebol Clube (SP) players
ACF Fiorentina players
América Futebol Clube (SP) players
Comercial Futebol Clube (Ribeirão Preto) players
Sertãozinho Futebol Clube players
América Futebol Clube (SP) managers
Uberaba Sport Club managers
Comercial Futebol Clube (Ribeirão Preto) managers
Associação Atlética Francana managers
Sertãozinho Futebol Clube managers
Kashiwa Reysol managers
Botafogo Futebol Clube (SP) managers
Shimizu S-Pulse managers
Association football forwards